Darryl Ritchings (born 11 August 1994) is a former speedway rider from England.

Speedway career
He rode in the top tier of British Speedway riding for the Swindon Robins during the 2014 Elite League speedway season. During the 2014 season he was involved in a serious accident when riding against Coventry. He started his speedway career in England riding for the Somerset Rebels in 2013.

References 

1994 births
Living people
British speedway riders
Coventry Bees riders
Ipswich Witches riders
Poole Pirates riders
Somerset Rebels riders
Swindon Robins riders